"She's Not Just Another Woman" is  a song written by Ron Dunbar and Clyde Wilson and performed by 8th Day.  It reached #3 on the U.S. R&B chart and spent three weeks at #11 on the U.S. pop chart and #10 in Canada in 1971.  It was featured on their 1971 album 8th Day.

The song was produced by Holland–Dozier–Holland.

The song ranked #64 on Billboard magazine's Top 100 singles of 1971.

Chart history

Weekly charts

Year-end charts

Other versions
100 Proof (Aged in Soul) released a version of the song on their 1971 album Somebody's Been Sleeping in My Bed.
Phoebe Snow released a version of the song entitled "He's Not Just Another Man" on her 1978 album Against the Grain.

Samplings
8th Day's version was sampled on the 1989 song "She's Not Just Another Woman (Monique)" by Biz Markie on his album The Biz Never Sleeps.
8th Day's version was sampled on the 1990 single "Born and Raised in Compton" by DJ Quik.

References

External links
 Lyrics of this song
 

1971 songs
1971 debut singles
Songs written by Ron Dunbar
Phoebe Snow songs
Song recordings produced by Brian Holland
Song recordings produced by Lamont Dozier